The Oldest Man, sometimes referred to as Duane Toddleberry, is a recurring character from comedy sketches featured on The Carol Burnett Show. The character was created by Tim Conway during his run on the show and is noted for Conway's performance of slapstick and ad-libbed humor. The character has been revisited in Conway's live comedy tour with fellow actor Harvey Korman from 2003 until Korman's death in 2008, twice on The Queen Latifah Show between 2014–2015, in a sketch in the Motion Picture & Television Fund, and also in the collector's edition DVD titled Together Again, which includes new sketches starring Tim Conway and Harvey Korman in their classic roles from The Carol Burnett Show.

The Oldest Man serves as one of the most beloved recurring characters on The Carol Burnett Show, in addition to being one of Conway's most famous characters. Throughout his career, Conway earned five Emmy Awards for his work on the show, and in 2002, he was inducted into the Television Hall of Fame.

Conway cites "The Fireman" as among his favorite sketches he's ever performed. In addition, Carol Burnett included one of "The Oldest Man" sketches - "Galley Slaves" - in her list of All-Time Favorite Sketches from The Carol Burnett Show.

Description 
The Oldest Man is known for his signature shuffle, created by his absurdly slow movements. As the Oldest Man, Tim Conway wears a rumpled white wig, typically along with a suit, and speaks in a slurred, droning voice. The character was created by Conway, who began as a recurring guest on The Carol Burnett Show before becoming a series regular beginning with the 1975–1976 season.

The Oldest Man appears in a variety of situations, performing a new type of role in each sketch. Some of the most notable including a slave in a galley ship, a fireman, a clock-maker, a butcher, and a shoe store salesman. Most often, the character plays opposite straight man Harvey Korman, who reacts with frustration and anger to The Oldest Man's lingering pace and unhelpful charades.

The Oldest Man is a strong example of slapstick comedy and clown acting, as the character typically performs exaggerated physical stunts and often injures himself comically in the process. For example, playing the grandfather character to Marion, Conway takes a drastically slow tumble down the stairs in one "As the Stomach Turns" sketch, aired October 20, 1969, or in The Oldest Torturer sketch, aired December 6, 1975, he slowly burns himself with a hot iron.

Origins 
Conway remarks that the idea for the Oldest Man character began with memories from earlier in life: “I broke my back in high school,” Conway says, “and walking to and from school that was my speed. That was the way I walked. So that got a lot of laughs.” Later, when working on The Carol Burnett Show, Conway claims the idea for the shuffling walk arrived spontaneously during one sketch. “Carol (Burnett) opened the door and I was supposed to walk to the couch and then I was going to talk to her but I was supposed to be this old man.  I started walking that way and as I was walking across the room I said to myself, ‘You know, if they don’t stop this the sketch is going to be about three days long.’  But nobody stopped me, we kept going, and that started that character.”

Conway says the spontaneity of the Oldest Man’s creation served as a way to make fellow actor Korman laugh. “A lot of the characters were created on air... Harvey would fall apart because the first time they saw the old man and the way I walked as the old man was when we were actually taping the show. So, when I started walking from the door and shuffling across the room as the rug was gathering in front of me (laughs), that was the first time that anybody had seen it.”

In regards to the Oldest Man, Carol Burnett also recognized Conway's strong desire to make Korman crack up during the show: "It was Tim's goal in life to destroy Harvey Korman."

Sketches

Later Appearances 
2003–2008: Together Again – Tour with Harvey Korman

2010: Together Again – Collector's DVD

2014: "The Oldest Ski Jumper" – The Queen Latifah Show

2015: "The Oldest White House Butler" – The Queen Latifah Show

References 

Television characters introduced in 1969
Carol Burnett
Comedy sketches
Comedy television characters
Male characters in television